Agnieszka Kurant (born 1978 in Lodz, Poland) is an interdisciplinary, conceptual artist who examines how economic, social, and cultural systems work in ways that blur the lines between reality and fiction.

Biography
Kurant studied at the University of Lodz and holds an MA in Curating from Goldsmiths College in London. Kurant is particularly interested in “the economy of the invisible,” which she explores in her work by creating imaginary locations, information systems, facts, and realities. Her work has been exhibited widely, including the Venice Biennale 12th International Architecture Exhibition, and is in the permanent collection of the Solomon R. Guggenheim Museum. Her work has been reviewed in major publications such as The New York Times, Art in America, frieze and Artforum, where she also has been featured as a contributing writer. She is represented by Tanya Bonakdar Gallery in New York, where she lives and works.

In 2015, the Solomon R. Guggenheim Museum commissioned her work The End of Signature to be projected onto the outside facade of the building and accessioned it to be part of the museum's permanent collection. Her first solo exhibition in the United States, exformation, was featured at SculptureCenter in 2013 and she had a solo exhibition at the Center for Contemporary Art, Tel Aviv in 2017. In 2010, Kurant represented Poland (along with the architect Aleksandra Wasilkowska) with the presentation Emergency Exit at the Venice Biennale 12th International Architecture Exhibition. Kurant was the 2017 visiting artist at MIT.

In 2020, Kurant was a recipient of 2020 Art + Technology Lab grant from the Los Angeles County Museum of Art.

Exhibitions

Solo exhibitions 
 2017: Assembly Line, The Center for Contemporary Art, Tel Aviv 
 2017–2018: Collective Intelligence, SCAD Museum of Art, Savannah

Group exhibitions 
2019:16th Istanbul Biennial
2019: XXII Milan Triennial, Broken Nature: Design Takes on Human Survival
2020–2021: Broken Nature, MoMA, New York
2020–2021: Uncanny Valley: Being Human in the Age of AI, De Young Museum, San Francisco

References

1978 births
Living people
21st-century Polish women artists
Polish conceptual artists
Women conceptual artists
Polish contemporary artists
University of Łódź alumni
Alumni of Goldsmiths, University of London